Farmacia Serra is a building close to the plaza of Bayamón, Puerto Rico which was built in 1910.  It was listed on the National Register of Historic Places in 1989.

It was the first in a chain of Serra drugstores eventually opened by Luis Serra.  He and his family lived upstairs.

It was the site of tertulias, meetings "of the town's politicians and intellectuals to discuss the latest events and decide what action could be taken."

It has " ornamentation" in its "modernismo" or Romantic Eclectic architecture.

References

National Register of Historic Places in Bayamón, Puerto Rico
Commercial buildings completed in 1910
Commercial buildings on the National Register of Historic Places in Puerto Rico
1910 establishments in Puerto Rico
Italian Renaissance Revival architecture
Pharmacies on the National Register of Historic Places
Health in Puerto Rico